Edward Heneage, 1st Baron Heneage,  (29 March 1840 – 10 August 1922) was a British Liberal and Liberal Unionist politician. He was briefly Chancellor of the Duchy of Lancaster under William Ewart Gladstone between February and April 1886, when he broke with Gladstone over Irish Home Rule and joined the Liberal Unionists.

Background and education
Heneage was the eldest son of George Heneage, of Hainton Hall, Lincolnshire, and Frances, daughter of Michael Tasburgh. He was educated at Eton and served with the 1st Life Guards from 1857 to 1863.

Political career
Heneage was elected Member of Parliament for Lincoln in 1865, a seat he held until 1868. He remained out of parliament until 1880, when he was returned for Grimsby. When the Liberals came to power under William Ewart Gladstone in February 1886, Heneage was appointed Chancellor of the Duchy of Lancaster and vice-president of the Committee of Agriculture and sworn of the Privy Council. However, he resigned these offices in April after disagreeing with Gladstone over Irish Home Rule. He joined the Liberal Unionist Party the same year.

Heneage lost his Grimsby seat at the 1892 general election, but was successfully returned for the same constituency in a by-election the following year. He was Chairman of the Liberal Unionist Council from 1893 to 1898. In June 1896 he was elevated to the peerage as Baron Heneage, of Hainton in the County of Lincoln. He was a regular contributor in the House of Lords, making his last speech in June 1920 at the age of 80.

Apart from his political career Heneage served as vice-chairman of Lindsey Quarter Sessions and as High Steward of Grimsby.

Family
Lord Heneage married Lady Eleanor Cecilia, daughter of William Hare, 2nd Earl of Listowel, in 1864, the same year he succeeded to his family estates. They had three sons and six daughters. Two of their sons went on to inherit the Baron Heneage title.

He died in August 1922, aged 82, and was succeeded in the barony by his eldest son, George. Lady Heneage survived him by two years and died in September 1924.

References

Work cited

External links 

Heneage, Edward Henaege, 1st Baron
Heneage, Edward Henaege, 1st Baron
Heneage, Edward Henaege, 1st Baron
English justices of the peace
Liberal Party (UK) MPs for English constituencies
Liberal Unionist Party MPs for English constituencies
UK MPs 1865–1868
UK MPs 1880–1885
UK MPs 1885–1886
UK MPs 1886–1892
British Life Guards officers
UK MPs 1892–1895
UK MPs who were granted peerages
People educated at Eton College
Politics of Lincoln, England
Members of the Parliament of the United Kingdom for Great Grimsby
Members of the Privy Council of the United Kingdom
Peers of the United Kingdom created by Queen Victoria
Chancellors of the Duchy of Lancaster